Moguls and Movie Stars is a 2010 Turner Classic Movies 7-part documentary.

The documentary tells the history of Hollywood pioneers making movies. This documentary features living relatives of Hollywood studio heads and film historians talking about the history of movies. The relatives of the moguls in the documentary include Samuel Goldwyn Jr., son of Samuel Goldwyn, Carla Laemmle, niece of Carl Laemmle, owner of Universal Pictures. This documentary tells the story of Hollywood from the late 19th century-the early 1970s. It starts off as telling the story of the early movie pioneers who came to America and would make a future making movies, the coming of sound movies, World War II, censorship, and Hollywood changing in the 1960s.

The series was narrated by Christopher Plummer.

The series took three years to  make. It was released on November 1, 2010.

Featured films (partial list)

 The Great Train Robbery (1903)
 The Musketeers of Pig Alley (1912)
 The Birth of a Nation (1915)
 Orphans of the Storm (1921)
 The Phantom of the Opera (1925)
 The Jazz Singer (1927)
 It (1927)
 Coquette (1929)
 Little Caesar (1931)
 The Public Enemy (1931)
 Gold Diggers of 1933 (1933)
 Footlight Parade (1933)
 Dames (1934)
 Top Hat (1935)
 Gone with the Wind (1939)
 The Great Dictator (1941)
 Singin' in the Rain (1952)
 Blackboard Jungle (1955)
 The Defiant Ones (1958)
 Cleopatra (1963)
 Bonnie and Clyde (1967)
 Guess Who's Coming to Dinner (1967)

Actors and stars featured

1910s
Charles Chaplin – actor, famous from 1914–early 1940s
Douglas Fairbanks – actor, famous from mid 1910s–late 1920s
Francis X. Bushman – actor, famous from early 1910s–late 1920s
Mabel Normand – actor, famous from early 1910s–early 1920s
Fatty Arbuckle – actor, famous from early 1910s–early 1920s
Gloria Swanson – actor, famous from early 1910s–1920s
Cecil B. Demille – producer, famous from late 1910s–late 1950s
Lillian Gish – actor, famous from early 1910s–early 1930s

1920s
Rudolph Valentino – actor, famous from 1921–until his death in 1926
Buster Keaton – actor, famous from 1920–early 1930s
Claudette Colbert – actor, famous from late 1920s–late 1940s
Norma Shearer – actress, famous from mid-1920s–1942, when she retired
Greta Garbo – actress, famous from late 1920s–1941, when she retired

1930s
Jean Harlow – actress
Bing Crosby – actor, singer
Al Jolson – actor, singer
Ruby Keeler – actress, singer, dancer
Joan Blondell – actress
Melvyn Douglas – actor
Fred MacMurray – actor, famous from late 1930s–late 1960s
Cary Grant – actor, famous from late 1930s–1966, when retired
Clark Gable – actor, famous from early 1930s–his death in 1960
John Wayne – actor, famous from 1939–his death in 1979
Spencer Tracy – actor, famous from 1930s–his death in 1967
Frank Capra – producer, famous from early 1930s–late 1950s
Edward G. Robinson – 
James Cagney – 
William Holden

1940s
Gene Tierney – actress, famous from early 1940s–mid-1950s
Natalie Wood – actress, famous from late 1940s–her death in 1981
Humphrey Bogart – actor, famous from 1941–his death in 1957
Lauren Bacall – actress, famous from 1944–1960s
William Holden – actor, famous from 1939–mid-1970s
Elizabeth Taylor – actress, famous from late 1940s–early 1970s
Lana Turner – actress, famous from early 1940s–late 1960s
Vincent Price – actor, famous from early 1940s–late 1950s
Cyd Charisse – actress, famous from late 1940s–early 1960s
Gregory Peck – actor, famous from mid-1940s–early 1970s
Cornel Wilde – actor, famous from early 1940s–late 1950s
Lucille Ball – actress, famous from mid-1940s–early 1970s
Errol Flynn-actor, famous late 1930s-1940s

1950s 
Marilyn Monroe – actress, famous from early 1950s–her death in 1962
Marlon Brando – actor, famous from early 1950s–until his death in 2004
Debbie Reynolds – actress, famous from early 1950s–early 1980s
Shirley MacLaine – actress, famous from 1950s–and still appears today in movies
James Dean – actor, famous from 1953–until his death in 1955
Audrey Hepburn – actress, famous from early 1950s–late 1970s
Jane Russell, actress, famous from late 1940s–late 1950s
Jack Lemmon, actor, famous from early 1950s–early 1990s

1960s
Dustin Hoffman – actor, famous from late 1960s–early 1990s
Robert Redford – actor, famous from late 1960s–early 1990s
Peter Sellers – actor, famous from early 1960s–until his death in 1980
Anne Bancroft – actress, famous in the 1960s–1970s
Warren Beatty – actor, famous from late 1960s–early 1990s

1970s
Jack Nicholson – actor

Episodes 

 Peepshow Pioneers (November 1, 2010)
 The Birth of Hollywood (November 8, 2010)
 The Dream Merchants (November 15, 2010)
 Brother, Can You Spare A Dream? (November 22, 2010)
 Warriors and Peacemakers (November 29, 2010)
 Attack of the Small Screens (December 6, 2010)
 Fade Out, Fade In (December 13, 2010)

Early moguls

Awards
The mini-series was nominated for three Primetime Emmy Awards, including Outstanding Nonfiction Series, Outstanding Writing for Nonfiction Programming, and Outstanding Voice-over Performance for Christopher Plummer's narration.

References

2010 American television series debuts
2010 American television series endings
2010s American documentary television series
Turner Classic Movies original programming